Darevskia portschinskii is a species of lizard in the family Lacertidae. The species is endemic to the South Caucasus region of Eurasia. There are two recognized subspecies.

Etymology
The specific name, portschinskii, is in honor of Russian entomologist Josef Aloizievitsch Portschinski (1848–1916).

Geographic range
D. portschinskii is found in Armenia, Azerbaijan, and Georgia.

Habitat

Reproduction
D. portschinskii is oviparous.

Subspecies
The following two subspecies, including the nominotypical subspecies, are recognized as being valid.
Darevskia portschinskii nigrita 
Darevskia portschinskii portschinskii

References

Further reading
Bakradze MA (1976), "New subspecies, Lacerta portschinskii nigrita ssp. n., from the eastern Transcaucasia". [Vestnik Zoologii ] 1976 (4): 54–57. (in Russian, with an abstract in English).
Bischoff, Wolfgang (1978). "Beiträge zur Kenntnis der Echsen des Kaukasus ". Salamandra 14 (4): 178–202. (in German).
Kessler K (1878). "[A zoological expedition to the Transcaucasian Territory in 1875]". [Transactions of the St. Petersburg Society of Naturalists] 8: 1–200. (Lacerta portschinskii, new species, pp. 160–163). (in Russian and Latin).
Sindaco R, Jeremčenko VK (2008). The Reptiles of the Western Palearctic. 1. Annotated Checklist and Distributional Atlas of the Turtles, Crocodiles, Amphisbaenians and Lizards of Europe, North Africa, Middle East and Central Asia. (Monographs of the Societas Herpetologica Italica). Latina, Italy: Edizioni Belvedere. 580 pp. .
Szczerbak, Nikolai (2003). Guide to the Reptiles of the Eastern Palearctic. Malabar, Florida: Krieger Publishing. 350 pp. .

Darevskia
Reptiles described in 1878
Taxa named by Karl Kessler